"Darlington County" is a 1984 song written and performed by Bruce Springsteen. It was released on the album Born in the U.S.A. and has remained a popular concert song for Springsteen and the E Street Band.

Lyrics 
The lyrics concern the protagonist and his buddy driving to Darlington County "looking for work on the county line", meeting girls along the way. In the song the protagonist tells girls that their fathers each own one of the 'World Trade Centers'.  The actual Darlington County is in South Carolina.

Background 
The version of the song that was released on the album was recorded in April or May 1982 at the Power Station in one of the early Born in the U.S.A. recording sessions.

Cover versions
Jeff Stevens and the Bullets took a cover version to No. 69 on the Hot Country Songs charts in 1987.

Live performance history
"Darlington County" was played in every leg of the Born in the U.S.A. Tour. The song did not emerge again until four days after the breakup with the Other Band. During the 1999 Reunion Tour, the song was performed frequently. It has remained popular in concert, and is often paired with "Working on the Highway" in performance. When performing the song live, Springsteen frequently plays the first few bars of the Rolling Stones' "Honky Tonk Women" before the first verse.

Personnel
According to authors Philippe Margotin and Jean-Michel Guesdon:

Bruce Springsteen – vocals, guitars
Steven Van Zandt – guitars, backing vocals
Roy Bittan – piano, backing vocals
Clarence Clemons – saxophone, cowbell, maracas, backing vocals
Danny Federici – organ
Garry Tallent – bass, backing vocals
Max Weinberg – drums, backing vocals

References

External links
 Lyrics & Audio clips from Brucespringsteen.net

1984 songs
Bruce Springsteen songs
Songs written by Bruce Springsteen
Song recordings produced by Jon Landau
Jeff Stevens and the Bullets songs
Song recordings produced by Bruce Springsteen
Song recordings produced by Steven Van Zandt
Song recordings produced by Chuck Plotkin